George Adimike is a Nigerian Catholic priest in Anambra state.

Early life and background

Career
Adimike worked as an associate Rector at the  Basilica of the Most Holy Trinity Onitsha. Afterwards, He was appointed as the Personal Assistant and the Press Secretary to the Archbishop of Onitsha. 
As a media personality, Adimike  was the Associate Director of Communications of the Roman Catholic Archdiocese of Onitsha.

Charity Work 
He was recognized immensely when he built a house for a poor widow at Enugu.

Reference

Living people
21st-century Nigerian clergy
Nigerian Roman Catholic priests
People from Anambra State